Théodore Chassériau (September 20, 1819 – October 8, 1856) was a Dominican-born French Romantic painter noted for his portraits, historical and religious paintings, allegorical murals, and Orientalist images inspired by his travels to Algeria. Early in his career he painted in a Neoclassical style close to that of his teacher Jean-Auguste-Dominique Ingres, but in his later works he was strongly influenced by the Romantic style of Eugène Delacroix. He was a prolific draftsman, and made a suite of prints to illustrate Shakespeare's Othello. The portrait he painted at the age of 15 of Prosper Marilhat, makes Théodore Chassériau the youngest painter exhibited at the Louvre museum.

Life and work

Chassériau was born in El Limón, Samaná, in the Spanish colony of Santo Domingo (now the Dominican Republic). His father Benoît Chassériau was a French adventurer who had arrived in Santo Domingo in 1802 to take an administrative position in what was until 1808 a French colony. Theodore's mother, Maria Magdalena Couret de la Blagniére, was the daughter of a mulatto landowner born in Saint-Domingue (now Haiti). In December 1820 the family left Santo Domingo for Paris, where the  young Chassériau soon showed precocious drawing skill. He was accepted into the studio of Jean-Auguste-Dominique Ingres in 1830, at the age of eleven, and became the favorite pupil of the great classicist, who regarded him as his truest disciple. (An account that may be apocryphal has Ingres declaring "Come, gentlemen, come see, this child will be the Napoleon of painting.")

After Ingres left Paris in 1834 to become director of the French Academy in Rome, Chassériau fell under the influence of Eugène Delacroix, whose brand of painterly colorism was anathema to Ingres. Chassériau's art has often been characterized as an attempt to reconcile the classicism of Ingres with the romanticism of Delacroix. He first exhibited at the Paris Salon in 1836, and was awarded a third-place medal in the category of history painting. In 1840 Chassériau travelled to Rome and met with Ingres, whose bitterness at the direction his student's work was taking led to a decisive break. While in Italy, Chassériau made landscape sketches and studied Renaissance frescoes.

Among the chief works of his early maturity are Susanna and the Elders and Venus Anadyomene (both 1839), Diana Surprised by Actaeon (1840), Andromeda Chained to the Rock by the Nereids (1840), and The Toilette of Esther (1841), all of which reveal a very personal ideal in depicting the female nude. Chassériau's major religious paintings from these years, Christ on the Mount of Olives (a subject he treated in 1840 and again in 1844) and The Descent from the Cross (1842), received mixed reviews from the critics; among the artist's champions was Théophile Gautier. In 1843, Chassériau painted murals depicting the life of Saint Mary of Egypt in the Church of Saint-Merri in Paris, the first of several commissions he received to decorate public buildings in Paris.

Portraits from this period include the Portrait of the Reverend Father Dominique Lacordaire, of the Order of the Predicant Friars (1840), and The Two Sisters (1843), which depicts Chassériau's sisters Adèle and Aline.

Throughout his life he was a prolific draftsman; his many portrait drawings executed with a finely pointed graphite pencil are close in style to those of Ingres. He also created a body of 29 prints, including a group of eighteen etchings of subjects from Shakespeare's Othello in 1844.

He exhibited the colossal portrait Ali-Ben-Hamet, Caliph of Constantine and Chief of the Haractas, Followed by his Escort in the Salon of 1845, where it received equivocal reviews. In 1846, Chassériau made his first trip to Algeria. From sketches made on this and subsequent trips he painted such subjects as Arab Chiefs Visiting Their Vassals and Jewish Women on a Balcony (both 1849, now in the Louvre). A major late work, The Tepidarium (1853, in the Musée d'Orsay), depicts a large group of women drying themselves after bathing, in an architectural setting inspired by the artist's trip in 1840 to Pompeii. His most monumental work was his decoration of the grand staircase of the Cour des Comptes, commissioned by the state in 1844 and completed in 1848. He followed the example of Delacroix in executing this work in oil on plaster, rather than in fresco. This work was heavily damaged in May 1871 by a fire set during the Commune, and only fragments could be recovered; these are preserved in the Louvre.

After a period of ill health, exacerbated by his exhausting work on commissions for murals to decorate the Churches of Saint-Roch and Saint-Philippe-du-Roule, Chassériau died at the age of 37 in Paris, on October 8, 1856. He is buried in the Montmartre Cemetery.

Legacy
His work had a significant impact on the style of Puvis de Chavannes and Gustave Moreau, and—through those artists' influence—reverberations in the work of Paul Gauguin and Henri Matisse. There is in Paris a Society for the painter: Association des Amis de Théodore Chassériau.

Works of Chassériau are in the Musée du Louvre where a room is dedicated to him, in the Musée d'Orsay, and in the Musée de Versailles. Collections in the United States holding works by Théodore Chassériau include the Metropolitan Museum of Art, New York, the Fogg Art Museum of Harvard University,  the National Gallery of Art of Washington, D.C., the Detroit Institute of Arts, the Museum of the Art Rhode Island School of Design, The J. Paul Getty Museum and the Art Institute of Chicago.

Exhibitions
 Théodore Chassériau: Parfum exotique,  National Museum of Western Art of Tokyo, Japan, February 28 – May 28, 2017 
 Théodore Chassériau: Obras sobre papel, Galerie nationale des beaux-arts de Santo Domingo and Centro cultural León de Santiago de los Caballeros, Dominican Republic, 2004
 Théodore Chassériau (1819–1856): A Different Romanticism, Metropolitan Museum of Art, New York (United States), Galeries nationales du Grand Palais in Paris (France) and Musée des beaux-arts de Strasbourg (France), 2002
 Chassériau (1819–1856): exposition au profit de la Société des amis du Louvre, Galerie Daber, Paris, France, 1976
 Theodore Chassériau (1819–1856), Musée des beaux-arts de Poitiers, France, 1969
 Théodore Chassériau, Musée national des beaux-arts d'Alger, Algeria, 1936
 Restrospective Théodore Chassériau (1819–1856), Musée de l'Orangerie, Paris, France, 1933
 Aquarelles et dessins de Chasseriau (1819–1856), Galerie L. Dru, Paris, France, 1927
 Les Peintres orientalistes français - 4e exposition: Rétrospective Théodore Chassériau, Galerie Durand-Ruel, Paris, France, 1897

Selected works
 Self-portrait - Musée du Louvre
 Aline Chassériau - Musée du Louvre
 Battle of Arab Horsemen Around a Standard (1854) - Dallas Museum of Art
 The Caliph of Constantine, also known as Ali Ben-Hamet, Caliph of Constantine and Chief of the Haractas, Followed by his Escort
 Arab Chiefs Challenging each other to Single Combat under the Ramparts of a City
 Andromeda Chained to the Rock by the Nereids
 Arab Chiefs Visiting their Vassals
 Christ on the Mount of Olives
 The Descent from the Cross
 Diana Surprised by Actaeon
 Jewish Women on a Balcony
 Othello and Desdemona in Venice
 Portrait of the Father Dominique Lacordaire, of the Order of the Predicant Friars
 Susanna and the Elders
 Venus Anadyomene
 The Tepidarium
 The Toilette of Esther
 The Two Sisters

Gallery

See also
 Léonce Bénédite
 List of Orientalist artists
 Orientalism

Notes

References
 Fisher, Jay M. (1979). Théodore Chassériau: Illustrations for Othello. Baltimore: The Baltimore Museum of Art. .
 Guégan, Stéphane; Pomarède, Vincent; Prat, Louis-Antoine (2002). Théodore Chassériau, 1819-1856: The Unknown Romantic. New Haven and London: Yale University Press. .
 Miller, Peter Benson (2004). "By the Sword and the Plow: Théodore Chassériau's Cour des Comptes Murals and Algeria," The Art Bulletin vol. 86, no. 4 (Dec. 2004), pp. 690–718.
 Prat, Louis-Antoine. n.d. Theodore Chassériau, 1819-1856: dessins conserves en dehors du Louvre. Paris: Galerie de Bayser [1989?]. .
 Rosenblum, Robert (1989). Paintings in the Musée d'Orsay. New York: Stewart, Tabori & Chang. .
 Rosenthal, Donald A. "Chassériau, Théodore". Grove Art Online. Oxford Art Online. Oxford University Press. Web.

Further reading
 Bénédite, Léonce (1931). Théodore Chassériau: sa vie et son œuvre, Paris: Les Éditions Braun. .
 Bouvenne, Aglaus (1884). Théodore Chassériau: Souvenirs et Indiscrétions, A. Detaille, Paris.
 Bouvenne, Aglaus. Théodore Chassériau : Souvenirs et Indiscrétions (1884), new edition by Les Amis de Théodore Chassériau, 2012 (French language), 2013 (Spanish language).
 Chevillard, Valbert (1893). Un peintre romantique: Théodore Chassériau, Paris.
 Chevillard, Valbert (1898). "Théodore Chassériau" in Revue de l'art ancien et moderne, no. 3, March 10, 1898.
 La Chronique des arts et de la curiosité, no. 9, February 27, 1897.
 Focillon, Henri (1927). "La peinture au XIXe: Le retour à l'antique" in Le Romanticisme, Paris.
 Gautier, Théophile. "L'Atelier de feu Théodore Chassériau" in L'Artiste, no. 14, March 15, 1857.
 Goodrich, Lloyd (1928). "Théodore Chassériau", The Arts 14.
 d'Hérouville, Xavier (2016). L'Idéal moderne selon Charles Baudelaire & Théodore Chassériau, L'Harmattan, Paris.
 Jingaoka, Megumi; Pomarède, Vincent; Nouvion, Jean-Baptiste; Guégan, Stéphane; Okasaka, Sakurako; Nakatsumi, Yuko (2017). Théodore Chassériau : Parfum exotique, [exhibition catalogue], The National Museum of Western Art (Japan).
 Laran, Jean (1913, 1921). Théodore Chassériau, Paris.
 Montesquiou, Robert de (1898). Alice et Aline, une peinture de Théodore Chassériau, Ed. Charpentier et Fasquelle, Paris.
 Nouvion, André-Pierre (2007). Trois familles en Périgord-Limousin dans la tourmente de la Révolution et de L'Empire : Nouvion, Besse-Soutet-Dupuy et Chassériau, Paris.
 Nouvion, Jean-Baptiste; Marianne de Tolentino (2014). Chassériau Correspondance oubliée. Les Amis de Théodore Chassériau edition, Paris.
 Peltre, Christine (2001). Théodore Chassériau. Paris: Gallimard. .
 Prat, Louis-Antoine (1988). Dessins de Théodore Chassériau: 1819–1856. Paris: Ministère de la culture et de la communication, Editions de la Réunion des musées nationaux.  .
 Renan, Ary (1897). Les Peintres orientalistes, Galerie Durand-Ruel.
 Sandoz, Marc (1974). Théodore Chassériau 1819–1856: catalogue raisonné des peintures et estampes. Paris : Arts et Métiers Graphiques. .
 Teupser, Werner. Theodore Chasseriau, Zeitschrift für Kunst.
 Vaillat, Léandre (August 1913). "L'Œuvre de Théodore Chassériau", Les Arts.
 Vaillat, Léandre (1907). "Chassériau", L'Art et les Artistes.

External links

 Website of the 'Amis de Théodore Chassériau' (France)
 Website of the Institut de France (Académie des Beaux-Arts) - Prix de Gravure Chassériau - Last prize was given in 2011 to Dominique Vaillier.
 Famille Chasseriau, Généalogie d'Haiti et de Saint-Domingue
 Portrait de femme
 

1819 births
1856 deaths
19th-century French painters
French male painters
French romantic painters
French portrait painters
Burials at Montmartre Cemetery
Theodore
Orientalist painters
19th-century painters of historical subjects
Dominican Republic people of French descent
Dominican Republic people of Haitian descent
19th-century French male artists